Klart spår till Tomteboda ("Clear Track to Tomteboda") was the Sveriges Television's Christmas calendar and Sveriges Radio's Christmas Calendar in 1968.

Plot 
Svante works as stationmaster at Tomteboda station, a minor station were a very few trains stop.

References

External links 
 

Swedish radio programs
1968 radio programme debuts
1968 radio programme endings
1968 Swedish television series debuts
1968 Swedish television series endings
Fiction about rail transport
Sveriges Radio's Christmas Calendar
Sveriges Television's Christmas calendar
Television shows set in Sweden